Nigel Jones may refer to:

 Nigel Jones, Baron Jones of Cheltenham (1948–2022), British Liberal Democrat politician
 Nigel Jones (cricketer) (born 1982), New Zealand born Irish cricketer
 Nigel Mazlyn Jones (born 1950), English guitarist, singer and songwriter
 Nigel H. Jones (born 1961), British historian, journalist and biographer